The 2006 New Mexico gubernatorial election was a race for the Governor of New Mexico held on November 7, 2006. Incumbent Democratic Governor Bill Richardson was running for re-election. He faced Republican John Dendahl in the general election and won by a landslide. , this was the last time a male candidate was elected Governor of New Mexico.

Primaries

Democratic
Bill Richardson, incumbent Governor of New Mexico
Anselmo A. Chavez, veteran and perennial candidate

Results

Republican
James R. Damron, physician
George Brent Bailey Jr., educator and minister

Results

General election

Candidates 
Bill Richardson (Democrat), incumbent Governor of New Mexico
John Dendahl (Republican), former chair of the Republican Party of New Mexico

Campaign 
Damron defeated Bailey in the Republican primary, but withdrew from the race on June 17, 2006 due to a lack of fundraising. John Dendahl was appointed by the Republican State Central Committee to replace him. There were no general election debates between the two candidates.

Predictions

Polling

Results

See also
United States gubernatorial elections, 2006

References

External links
Campaign websites (Archived)
Bill Richardson
John Dendahl

Governor
2006
New Mexico